The 2017 MAC Championship Game was an NCAA Division I college football conference championship game for the Mid-American Conference (MAC) Championship that was played on December 2, 2017.  The game featured the East Division champion Akron Zips against the West Division champion Toledo Rockets.  It was the 21st MAC Football Championship Game and was played in Detroit at Ford Field.  Toledo won the game 45–28 behind 4 touchdown passes from Logan Woodside.

References

Championship Game
MAC Championship Game
Toledo Rockets football games
Akron Zips football games
American football competitions in Detroit
December 2017 sports events in the United States
MAC Championship
MAC Championship